Seven Songs is the debut studio album by English band 23 Skidoo, released in 1982 by record label Fetish.

Reception 

AllMusic called it "post-punk at its most invigorating and terrifying." Trouser Press called it "a near-brilliant fusion of funk, tape tricks and African percussion".

Track listing
"Kundalini"
"Vegas El Bandito"
"Mary's Operation"
"Lock Groove"
"New Testament"
"IY"
"Porno Base"
"Quiet Pillage"
"Untitled"

References

External links 

 

1982 debut albums
23 Skidoo (band) albums
Post-punk albums by English artists